Lucio Mujesan (born January 11, 1943) is an Italian former footballer who scored 146 goals from 379 appearances in the Italian professional leagues. He played for 4 seasons (73 games, 21 goals) in Serie A for Bologna, Hellas Verona and Roma. He was born in Piran, which was in Italy but is now part of Slovenia.

Honours
 Coppa Italia winner: 1969/70.
 Top scorer of Coppa Italia: 1967/68 (6 goals).
 Top scorer of Serie B: 1967/68 (19 goals).

References

1943 births
Living people
Italian footballers
Association football forwards
A.C.R. Messina players
Venezia F.C. players
U.S. Avellino 1912 players
S.S.C. Bari players
Bologna F.C. 1909 players
Hellas Verona F.C. players
A.S. Roma players
S.S. Arezzo players
U.S. Salernitana 1919 players
Italian football managers
U.S. Salernitana 1919 managers
Cosenza Calcio managers
Serie A players
Serie B players
Serie C players
Istrian Italian people